Celerity IT is a Virginia based consulting firm that specializes in business and technology advisory services such as customer experience, design thinking, operational excellence, intelligent automation, business process and strategy, and a variety of Agile consulting services. Celerity was established in 2002 by Michael Berkman and Lewis Waters in McLean, Virginia. Celerity maintains offices in New York, NY; Harrisburg, PA; Pittsburgh, PA; Richmond, VA; Boston, MA; McLean, VA; Baltimore, MD; and Dallas, TX. They also offer technology services out of Clujj, Romania. Celerity launched Celerity Government Services (CGS) in 2009, which later spun off as Xcelerate Solutions.

In 2013, Celerity acquired 3PC Media, a digital agency based in Pittsburgh, Pennsylvania.

In 2015, Celerity was acquired by the French firm, AUSY.

Awards
In 2005, 2006, 2007, 2011, and 2012, Celerity was named as one of the 50 Fastest Growing Companies in the Greater Washington, D.C. Area by the Washington Business Journal.

In 2007, Celerity was listed as #143 in Inc. Magazine’s Fortune 500 List of Fastest Growing Private Companies.

In 2010 and 2011, Celerity PA was named one of the Best Places to Work in Pennsylvania. From 2010-2013, Celerity PA was also a Central Penn Business Journal Business of the Year Award Finalist.

In 2014, Celerity's work on the National Geographic website won a Nielsen Norman Award for Best Intranet Design and a 2014 Ektron Site of the Year award for the Intranet category.

In 2012, founding CEO Michael Berkman was an Ernst & Young Entrepreneur of the Year Award Finalist for the Greater Washington Area.

In 2015, Celerity's work on the Association of American Medical Colleges (AAMC) website won gold in the 2015 Horizon Interactive Awards in three categories: advocacy, health, and university. The site also won gold at the 2016 AVA Digital Awards.

References

External links
 

Consulting firms established in 2002
Information technology management
Companies based in McLean, Virginia